The mixed doubles badminton event at the 2014 Summer Youth Olympics were held at Nanjing Sport Institute. It was the first time the event was part of the Youth Olympic Games sports program and it was part of the mixed NOC events. The 64 qualified athletes from the boys and girls events was divided to mixed team. The 32 teams were split into eight groups, with four teams each. In their groups, they play a one-way round-robin and the first team of each group qualifies to the quarterfinals, where they play a knock-out stage until the medal matches.

Group play

Groups

Results

Group A

Group B

Group C

Group D

Group E

Group F

Group G

Group H

Knockout stage

References
Aug 17, 2014 results
Aug 18, 2014 results
Aug 19, 2014 results
Aug 20, 2014 results
Aug 21, 2014 results
Aug 22, 2014 results

Badminton at the 2014 Summer Youth Olympics
Mixed doubles badminton